Makadara Constituency is an electoral constituency in Nairobi City County, Kenya. It is one of seventeen constituencies in the county. It was renamed prior to the 1997 elections, but was also known as Doonholm Constituency for the 1963 and 1969 elections, then as Bahati Constituency. It consists of 
some central and southern of central areas of Nairobi County. The entire constituency is located within Nairobi City County, and has an area of 13 km². The current constituency boundaries were revised prior to the 2013 elections.

Mwai Kibaki, who later became the president of Kenya, served as a Makadara MP before moving to Othaya Constituency. The constituency was also represented by Gideon Kioko Mbuvi who was elected in a by-election in 2010, replacing Dickson Wathika, whose election in 2007 was invalidated due to 'election irregularities'. Sonko went on to become the senator for Nairobi County in 2013, and is currently the Governor of Nairobi County which is also the Capital of Kenya.

Members of Parliament

County Assembly wards

Makadara Sub-county
The Sub-county shares the same boundaries as the constituency. The Sub-county is headed by the sub-county administrator, appointed by a County Public Service Board.

References

External links 
Map of the constituency
Uchaguzikenya.com - Constituency profile

Constituencies in Nairobi
1963 establishments in Kenya
Constituencies established in 1963